Wheat rusts include three types of Pucciniae:

P. triticina, wheat leaf rust, leaf rust, wheat brown rust, or brown rust
P. graminis, stem rust, wheat stem rust, barley stem rust, or black rust
P. striiformis:
P. striiformis var. striiformis, stripe rust, yellow rust, yellow stripe rust, or strip rust
P. striiformis var. tritici, wheat yellow rust or wheat stripe rust

See also
 For the mobile application see Nuru